Hannele may refer to:

 Hannele (name), a Finnish female given name
 The Assumption of Hannele, also known simply as Hannele, an 1893 play by Gerhart Hauptmann